Philip Hugh Gulliver (2 September 1921 – 30 March 2018) was a Canadian anthropologist specifically in Oriental and African Studies, a Distinguished Professor Emeritus at York University and also a Fellow of the Royal Society of Canada.

References

1921 births
2018 deaths
Academic staff of York University
Canadian anthropologists
People from Essex (before 1965)
British emigrants to Canada
Alumni of the London School of Economics
Royal Air Force personnel of World War II
Fellows of the Royal Society of Canada